Joe Periton (1901–1980) was a rugby union international who represented England from 1925 to 1930. He also captained his country.

Early life

Rugby union career
Periton made his international debut on 17 January 1925 at Twickenham in the England vs Wales match.
Of the 21 matches he played for his national side he was on the winning side on 12 occasions.
He played his final match for England on 15 March 1930 at Twickenham in the England vs Scotland match.

References

1901 births
1980 deaths
English rugby union players
England international rugby union players
Rugby union flankers
Lancashire County RFU players